Universal Religion Chapter 2, also known as Universal Religion 2004: Live From Armada At Ibiza is the second compilation album in the Universal Religion compilation series mixed and compiled by Dutch DJ and record producer Armin van Buuren. It was released on 5 April 2004 by Armada Music.

The digital download version was released on 5 April 2004 on iTunes and contains edits of the individual songs listed, as well as the full continuous mix.

Track listing

References

External links
 at Discogs

Armin van Buuren compilation albums
Electronic compilation albums
2004 compilation albums